Chestnut Ridge is an unincorporated community in Jackson County, Indiana, in the United States.

History
A post office was established at Chestnut Ridge in 1878. Renamed Chestnut in 1894, the post office was discontinued in 1902.

References

Unincorporated communities in Jackson County, Indiana
Unincorporated communities in Indiana